Augacephalus ezendami is a tarantula found in Mozambique, it was first described by Richard C. Gallon in 2001. It is named after Thomas Ezendam, whom provided Gallon with numerous specimens.

Description 
A. ezendami has a black carapace, with golden striping. Its femur is golden, while the opisthosoma and legs are creamy or tan, with a black fishbone pattern.

Habitat 
They are found in the tropical savannas of Mozambique.

Behavior 
As a defensive tarantula, A. ezendami is are obligate burrower, which means it will usually stay in the entrance of its burrow and wait for prey. It is also a quite prolific webber, making webs if there is no are available places to burrow.

References 

Spiders of Africa
Spiders described in 2001
Theraphosidae